Thunder Road may refer to:

Film 
Thunder Road (1958 film), a moonshine bootlegger crime film starring Robert Mitchum
Thunder Road (2016 film), a short comedy-drama film by Jim Cummings
Thunder Road (2018 film), a comedy-drama film directed by and starring Jim Cummings, based on his short of the same name.
Thunder Road, a fictional spaceship in Explorers, 1985
Thunder Road Films, a film and television production company

Music
 "The Ballad of Thunder Road", a 1957 song co-written and performed by Robert Mitchum for the 1958 film
 "Thunder Road" (song), a 1975 song by Bruce Springsteen
 Thunder Road, a 1980s Canadian band led by David Thompson
 "Thunder Road", a 2001 song by Judas Priest from Point of Entry

Sports and games
 Thunder Road (board game), a racing game published by Milton Bradley
 Thunder Road Handicap, an annual American Thoroughbred horse race at Santa Anita Park in Arcadia, California
 Thunder Road International SpeedBowl, a short-track speedway in Barre, Vermont
 Thunder Road Marathon, an annual marathon in Charlotte, North Carolina

Other uses
 Thunder Road (roller coaster), a former wooden roller coaster at Carowinds in North and South Carolina
Georgia State Route 9, used by moonshiners during Prohibition
Georgia Highway 197, used by moonshiners during Prohibition
Tennessee State Route 33, part of the route inspiring the moonshine song, "The Ballad of Thunder Road"
 Thunder Road, a former turbo-simulator ride at Dollywood in Pigeon Forge, Tennessee
 Thunder Road, the first original mobile comic, by Steven Sanders
National Route 13 (Vietnam), a nickname given by US forces during the Vietnam War

See also
 Thunder Alley (disambiguation)